Kenneth McAlpine  (born 21 September 1920) is a British former racing driver from England.

Biography
McAlpine was born in Cobham, Surrey and is a grandson of Scottish civil engineer Sir Robert McAlpine, 1st Baronet. He participated in seven Formula One World Championship Grands Prix, debuting on 19 July 1952 at the British Grand Prix. He scored no championship points.
During the development of the Connaught Racing Team based at Send in Surrey, McAlpine became a considerable financial backer and enjoyed several team owner triumphs including Tony Brooks's memorable F1 victory at the 1955 Syracuse Grand Prix. The team was eventually broken up in 1958 and cars sold off.

McAlpine and co-driver Eric Thompson took part in the 1955 24 Hours of Le Mans driving a Connaught ALSR. They retired after 6 hours with engine failure.

After retiring from motor racing, McAlpine returned full-time to his civil engineering business and later established a successful English wine growing and bottling business at his estate in Lamberhurst, Kent. He is also a member of The Air Squadron.

Complete Formula One World Championship results
(key)

Non-championship results
(key)

References

1920 births
English centenarians
Living people
24 Hours of Le Mans drivers
Connaught Formula One drivers
British businesspeople
Deputy Lieutenants
English Formula One drivers
English racing drivers
Kenneth
People from Cobham, Surrey
World Sportscar Championship drivers

Formula One team owners
Men centenarians